55 Broadway is a Grade I listed building close to St James's Park in London.  Upon completion, it was the tallest office block in the city. In 1931 the building earned architect Charles Holden the RIBA London Architecture Medal.  In 2020, it was announced that it will be converted to a luxury hotel.

History
London Transport occupied the building 1933–1984, followed by its successors London Regional Transport from 1984–2000, and Transport for London 2000–2020. TfL vacated the building in 2020.

Description
Faced with Portland stone and covering a site with an irregular footprint, the upper office floors of the building are on a cruciform plan, stepping back towards the central clock tower at the top. The cruciform design afforded the optimum level of natural light to the offices. The ground floor now contains a shopping arcade and has many art deco details. Previously, the ground floor was also given over to London Transport offices, including a travel information centre, cash office and a library. The whole building straddles St James's Park tube station, the east and west wings being immediately above the railway tunnel. When finished, it was the tallest steel-framed office building in London, until construction of another Holden building, the University of London's Senate House (based on similar designs and materials).

On each elevation, the pediment above the sixth floor is decorated with a relief, collectively known as 'the four winds', although the four points of the compass are repeated twice for a total of eight reliefs. Each relief was carved by an avant-garde sculptor of the day.

Halfway along the north and east facades are a matched pair of sculptures, Day and Night by Jacob Epstein. The modernism and graphic nakedness of these sculptures created public outrage on their unveiling. Newspapers started a campaign to have the statues removed and one company director, Lord Colwyn, offered to pay the cost. Frank Pick, the managing director of the UERL at the time, took overall responsibility and offered his resignation over the scandal. In the end, Epstein agreed to remove 1.5 inches from the penis of the smaller figure on Day and ultimately the furore died down.

The function suite on the 10th floor of the building was formerly set up as a dining room for the Chairman and senior executives. At this level, there are also four roof gardens, one of which was dedicated to the wife of a former managing director in recognition of her enthusiasm in encouraging this early form of environmental work.

The building, first listed as Grade II in 1970, was upgraded to Grade I in 2011.

In 2013, it was announced that 55 Broadway would be converted into luxury apartments, once London Underground moved operations from the building in 2015 to their new headquarters in the Olympic Park, Stratford, London. In May 2014, it was announced that the architects, TateHindle, would lead the redevelopment and, in June 2015, planning permission and listed building consent was granted: however, this was not implemented and the planning permission expired in June 2018.

In September 2019, a long-term lease of the property was sold by Transport for London for £120 million to Integrity International Group, founded by Tony Matharu.

In May 2020, it was announced that Blue Orchid Hotels, a subsidiary of Integrity International, would convert the structure into a luxury hotel.

Commissioned art work
Day and Night, Jacob Epstein
North Wind, Alfred Gerrard
North Wind, Eric Gill
East Wind, Eric Gill
East Wind, Allan G. Wyon
South Wind, Eric Gill
South Wind, Eric Aumonier
West Wind, Samuel Rabinovitch
West Wind, Henry Moore

Reference
https://www.radiotimes.com/tv/entertainment/reality-tv/rise-and-fall-filming-location/

Bibliography
Modern Architectural Sculpture, Ed. William Aumonier, The Architectural Press, London 1930

External links

 Transport for London - 55 Broadway
 London Transport Museum Photographic Archive
Integrity International Group  
 Building

 Sculptures

 Underground Journeys: The Heart of London Illustrated history of 55 Broadway, from the Royal Institute of British Architects

Grade I listed buildings in the City of Westminster
Grade I listed office buildings
London Underground
Transport architecture in London
Art Deco architecture in London
Charles Holden buildings
Office buildings completed in 1929
Commercial buildings completed in 1929
Transport in London